Tel Burna is an Israeli archaeological site located in the Shephelah (Judean foothills), along the banks of Nahal Guvrin, not far from modern-day Qiryat Gat.

History and identification
The site was primarily inhabited in the Bronze and Iron Ages, and was one of a series of sites along the border between Judah and Philistia in the Iron Age.  The first excavations at the site were conducted in the summer of 2010, as part of a long term archaeological project, headed by Itzhaq Shai and Joe Uziel, affiliated with Bar Ilan University.

Tel Burna is located near Beit Guvrin/Maresha, Tel Goded, Lachish, Tell es-Safi/Gath and Tel Zayit. Due to its location, and its prominence in the Iron Ages, W. Albright and Y. Aharoni, among others, have suggested identifying the site with Libnah,<ref>{{cite book |last=Aharoni|first=Y. |author-link=Yohanan Aharoni |title=The Land of the Bible: A Historical Geography|edition=2 |publisher=Westminster Press |location=Philadelphia|year=1979|page=439 |language=en|isbn=0664242669 |oclc=6250553}} (original Hebrew edition: 'Land of Israel in Biblical Times - Historical Geography', Bialik Institute, Jerusalem (1962))</ref> a site mentioned several times in the Bible, and noted to be one of the 13 Kohanic cities. Libnah had also revolted against the Kingdom of Judah in the 9th century BCE and where Hamutal, Queen of Judah in the 7th century BCE was born.

Eusebius (3rd–4th century CE) in his Onomasticon mentions the ancient biblical city of Gath, saying that it was a village formerly inhabited by the Anakim and that the village was still inhabited in his day and situated "not far from Eleutheropolis (Beit Gubrin) near Diospolis (Lod), near the fifth milestone from Eleutheropolis." Nearby Maresha is placed by Eusebius at about 2 milestones from Eleutheropolis ( southeast of Beit Gubrin.

Survey results
An extensive archaeological survey was conducted at the site in June 2009.  It was found that the site is approximately 100 dunams, with settlements in the Early Bronze Age II/III, Middle Bronze Age II, Late Bronze Age, Iron Age I and Iron Age II. The largest settlement at the site seems to date to the Iron Age II, when the summit was enclosed by fortifications, still visible on the surface today.

Excavation results
The excavations in 2010-2019 revealed that the site's summit was not settled after the Persian period. Remains uncovered include the Iron Age fortifications, living surfaces dating to the 9th century BCE, and several silos dating to the 7th century BCE. If in fact the location of Libnah should be sought out at Tel Burna, the excavations thus far do conform to what is understood about the city from the Biblical texts. Moreover, some recent work in 2013 has led the leader of the excavation, Itzhaq Shai, program director of the Tel Burna Excavation Project, to believe that Tel Burna is the site of the biblical town of Libnah.

References

External links
 Tel Burna site

Archaeological sites in Israel